WSCO (1570 AM) is a radio station broadcasting a sports format. Licensed to Appleton, Wisconsin, the station serves the Appleton-Oshkosh area.  The station is currently owned by Woodward Communications, Inc. and features local, state, and National Programming.  WSCO is also heard on FM translators W237AA 95.3 MHz in Appleton and W256DD 99.1 MHz in Oshkosh. WSCO's studios are located on College Avenue in Appleton, while its AM transmitter is located in Menasha.

The station signed on in 1952 as WAPL. The call letters were changed to WVMS on October 4, 1978.  On September 1, 1985, the station changed its call sign to WRJQ and to the current WSCO on January 31, 2002.

References

External links
FCC History Cards for WSCO

SCO
Sports radio stations in the United States
Radio stations established in 1952